Jijel is a province (wilaya) in Algeria, on the eastern Mediterranean coast. The capital is Jijel (Phoenician name : Igilgili).  Taza National Park is located in this province.

History
The province was created from parts of Constantine (department) and Sétif (département) in 1974.

In 1984 Mila Province was carved out of its territory.

Administrative divisions
The province is divided into 11 districts, which are further divided into 28 communes or municipalities.

Districts

 Chekfa
 Djimla
 El Ancer 
 El Aouana
 El Milia
 Jijel
 Settara
 Sidi Maârouf
 Taher
 Texenna
 Ziama Mansouriah

Communes

 Bordj T'har
 Boucif Ouled Askeur
 Boudriaa Ben Yadjis
 Bouraoui Belhadef
 Chahna
 Chekfa
 Djemaa Beni Habibi
 Djimla
 El Ancer
 El Aouana
 El Kennar Nouchfi
 El Milia
 Emir Abdelkader
 Eraguene
 Ghebala
 Jijel
 Kaous
 Kheïri Oued Adjoul
 Ouadjana
 Ouled Rabah
 Ouled Yahia Khedrouche
 Selma Benziada
 Settara
 Sidi Abdelaziz
 Sidi Maarouf
 Taher
 Texenna
 Ziama Mansouriah

See also

References

External links
 Official website of the Province
 Jijel local on-line news
 Jijel news 
 Jijel on-line
 Djidjelli.com

 
Provinces of Algeria
States and territories established in 1974